Archery was contested from October 6 to October 10 at the 1994 Asian Games in Senogawa Park, Hiroshima, Japan. The competition included only recurve events.

A total of 67 archers from 13 nations competed at the 1994 Asian Games, South Korea dominated the competition winning three out of four gold medals.

Medalists

Medal table

Participating nations
A total of 67 athletes from 13 nations competed in archery at the 1994 Asian Games:

References 
 New Straits Times, October 12–15, 1994
 Results

External links 
 Olympic Council of Asia

 
1994 Asian Games events
1994
Asian Games
1994 Asian Games